Dirceu Lopes, full name  Dirceu Lopes Mendes (born 3 September 1946 in Pedro Leopoldo) is a retired Brazilian footballer. He was attacking midfielder and forward who played mainly with Cruzeiro. He had seven caps with the Brazil national team, scoring one goal.

References

1946 births
Living people
Brazilian footballers
Brazil international footballers
1975 Copa América players
Cruzeiro Esporte Clube players
Fluminense FC players
People from Pedro Leopoldo
Association football midfielders
Association football forwards
Sportspeople from Minas Gerais